Johannes Jansz van Bronckhorst (1627 – 1656), was a Dutch Golden Age painter who died young.

Biography
He was born in Utrecht and was a pupil of Jan Gerritsz van Bronckhorst. He travelled to Rome, and became a member of Bentvueghels (nickname unknown). In Rome, he became friends with the poet Reyer Anslo, whose portrait he painted.
He died in Amsterdam.

References

Johannes Jansz. van Bronckhorst on Artnet

1627 births
1656 deaths
Dutch Golden Age painters
Dutch male painters
Artists from Utrecht
Members of the Bentvueghels